The 12th Legislative Assembly of British Columbia sat from 1910 to 1912. The members were elected in the British Columbia general election held in November 1909. The British Columbia Conservative Party led by Richard McBride formed the government.

David McEwen Eberts served as speaker.

Members of the 12th General Assembly 
The following members were elected to the assembly in 1909.:

Notes:

Party standings

By-elections 
By-elections were held for the following members appointed to the provincial cabinet, as was required at the time:
 William Roderick Ross, Minister of Lands, elected November 26, 1910

By-elections were held to replace members for various other reasons:

Notes:

Other changes
Liberal John Jardine crossed the floor to join the Conservatives in 1911.

References 

Political history of British Columbia
Terms of British Columbia Parliaments
1910 establishments in British Columbia
1912 disestablishments in British Columbia
20th century in British Columbia